Boško Krunić (21 October 1929 – 23 January 2017) was a Yugoslav Communist politician. He was a chairman of the Presidency of League of Communists of Yugoslavia for one year between 1987 and 1988, and previously served as Secretary of the Provincial Committee of the League of Communists of Vojvodina from 1981 to 1982, and again from 1984 to 1985 as President of the Presidency. Krunić died on 23 January 2017 at the age of 87.

Anti-bureaucratic revolution

Krunić resigned from the League of Communists of Vojvodina in 1988 pressured by the events of the Anti-bureaucratic revolution, which in Vojvodina had been led by Mihalj Kertes.

References

1929 births
2017 deaths
People from Pećinci
Yugoslav communists
Presidency of the Socialist Federal Republic of Yugoslavia members